Twomileborris (also known as Two-Mile Burris and Borrisleigh) is a civil parish in the barony of Eliogarty, County Tipperary. 

The river Liscaveen forms some of the boundary between it and the parish of Ballymoreen; Twomileborris contains an enclave belonging to the latter parish, comprising the townland of Rathcunikeen.

Geography

The parish comprises 7988 statute acres and is divided into nineteen townlands:

According to Samuel Lewis, in 1837 the Church of Ireland living was a rectory in the  diocese of Cashel, formed at a time earlier than extant records by uniting the vicarages of Boly or Galvoly (civil parish of Galbooly) and Drom with the chapelry of Leogh (Leigh).
There are two villages in the parish: Two-Mile Borris and Littleton.

Derivation of Placename

The English-language name
Borrisleigh is derived from the Irish-language Buiríos Léith, as is the last word in the alternative English-language name for the parish, Two-Mile Burris.

References

 Borrisleigh